The Korean Cultural Centre UK (KCCUK) was opened by the Korean Ministry of Culture and Tourism (MCST) on 31 January 2008 just off London's Trafalgar Square. The role of the KCCUK is to enhance friendship, amity and understanding between South Korea and the UK through cultural and educational activities. From the KCCUK's central London location their cultural team works to further develop established cultural projects, introduce new opportunities and to expand their Korean events programme in the UK all of which creates stronger ties with the UK through enhanced cultural exchange.

Exhibitions
The KCCUK holds regular exhibitions at its centre throughout the year, as well as the annual UK-based Korean Artists Exhibition each December. In 2011, the KCCUK, in partnership with the KCCNY produced their first joint-exhibition with another Cultural Centre, named NyLon and in 2010; the KCCUK's Exhibition ‘Present from the Past’ raised over £20,000 for the British veterans of the Korean War.

Performances and Events
The KCCUK holds regular events both onsite and offsite throughout the year. At the KCC there are regular concerts and K-pop Nights as well as talks, lectures, workshops and gallery tours. Offsite, the KCCUK produces the annual ‘London Korean Film Festival’ as well as frequently participating in the Mayor's Thames Festival and the Edinburgh International Festival.

Korean Language Courses
The Sejong Institute at the Korean Cultural Centre UK is the Korean language course that offers a social education programme.
Upon completing the course students are able to express themselves in Korean on a vast range of topics.

Film Club
For larger groups, the KCCUK operates a Film Club, where 5 or more guests can watch Korean Films in the Main hall or Video Rooms.

References

South Korea–United Kingdom relations
Cultural organisations based in London
Cultural centers
2008 in London
2008 establishments in England